The 2022 Swedish Open, also known as Nordea Open, for sponsorship reasons, was a professional tennis tournament played on outdoor clay courts as part of the ATP Tour 250 Series of the 2022 ATP Tour and as part of the WTA 125 tournaments. It took place in Båstad, Sweden, from 4 through 9 July 2022 for the women's tournament, and from 11 through 17 July 2022 for the men's tournament. It was the 74th edition of the event for the men and the 12th edition for the women.

Champions

Men's singles

  Francisco Cerúndolo def.  Sebastián Báez, 7–6(7–4), 6–2

Women's singles

  Jang Su-jeong def.  Rebeka Masarova 3–6, 6–3, 6–1

Men's doubles

  Rafael Matos /  David Vega Hernández def.  Simone Bolelli /  Fabio Fognini, 6–4, 3–6, [13–11]

Women's doubles

  Misaki Doi /  Rebecca Peterson def.  Mihaela Buzărnescu /  Irina Khromacheva walkover

Points and prize money

Point distribution

Prize money 

1 Qualifiers prize money is also the Round of 32 prize money
* per team

ATP singles main-draw entrants

Seeds

 1 Rankings are as of 27 June 2022.

Other entrants
The following players received wildcards into the main draw:
  Lorenzo Musetti
  Stan Wawrinka
  Elias Ymer

The following players received entry using a protected ranking into the main draw:
  Dominic Thiem

The following players received entry from the qualifying draw:
  Federico Delbonis
  Tomás Martín Etcheverry
  Marc-Andrea Hüsler
  Pedro Sousa

The following player received entry as a lucky loser:
  Fabio Fognini

Withdrawals
  Filip Krajinović → replaced by  Hugo Gaston
  Pedro Martínez → replaced by  Daniel Altmaier
  Alex Molčan → replaced by  Laslo Đere
  Oscar Otte → replaced by  Federico Coria
  Arthur Rinderknech → replaced by  Fabio Fognini

ATP doubles main-draw entrants

Seeds

1 Rankings are as of 27 June 2022.

Other entrants
The following pairs received wildcards into the doubles main draw:
  Filip Bergevi /  Łukasz Kubot
  Leo Borg /  Elias Ymer

Withdrawals
Before the tournament
  Harri Heliövaara /  Emil Ruusuvuori → replaced by  Aslan Karatsev /  Philipp Oswald
  Nikola Ćaćić /  Filip Krajinović → replaced by  Nikola Ćaćić /  Aleksandr Nedovyesov 
  Pedro Martínez /  Albert Ramos Viñolas → replaced by  Marc-Andrea Hüsler /  Pavel Kotov
  Kevin Krawietz /  Andreas Mies → replaced by  Francisco Cerúndolo /  Tomás Martín Etcheverry

WTA singles main-draw entrants

Seeds

 1 Rankings are as of 27 June 2022.

Other entrants
The following players received wildcards into the main draw:
  Jacqueline Cabaj Awad
  Caijsa Hennemann
  Kajsa Rinaldo Persson
  Lisa Zaar

The following player received entry using a protected ranking:
  Varvara Flink

The following players received entry as an alternate:
  Peangtarn Plipuech
  Olivia Tjandramulia

Withdrawals 
Before the tournament
  Kateryna Baindl → replaced by  Malene Helgø
  Magdalena Fręch → replaced by  Grace Min
  Anna Kalinskaya → replaced by  Jang Su-jeong
  Katarzyna Kawa → replaced by  Renata Zarazúa
  Marta Kostyuk → replaced by  Anastasia Kulikova
  Danka Kovinić → replaced by  Valentini Grammatikopoulou
  Aleksandra Krunić → replaced by  Katarina Zavatska
  Claire Liu → replaced by  Louisa Chirico → replaced by  Peangtarn Plipuech
  Nuria Párrizas Díaz → replaced by  İpek Öz
  Zheng Qinwen → replaced by  Olivia Tjandramulia

WTA doubles main-draw entrants

Seeds

1 Rankings are as of 27 June 2022.

Other entrants
The following pair received a wildcard into the doubles main draw:
  Kajsa Rinaldo Persson /  Lisa Zaar

References

External links 
 

Swedish Open
Swedish Open
Swedish Open
Swedish Open
Swedish Open